The State Route System of Tennessee is maintained and developed by the Tennessee Department of Transportation (TDOT) in the US state of Tennessee. All of the U.S. Routes in Tennessee have a state route routed concurrently with them, though the state route is hidden and only signed along the green mile marker signs that display mileage within each county. Since 1983, state routes have been divided into primary and secondary routes.

Description
State routes in Tennessee are divided into primary and secondary routes, the former being part of the federal-aid primary highway system, and the latter part of the federal-aid secondary highway system. Most routes with primary designations also have secondary designations; very few state routes in Tennessee have only primary designations. Secondary segments of dual-designated routes are often considered primary routes, however. 

State routes in Tennessee do not follow a systematic numbering system unlike the U.S. Highway System and some other states' highway systems. However, routes with similar numberings, especially short secondary routes, tend to be located close to each other. Mile markers for state routes in Tennessee are based on the mileage for each county, and not the entire route. The route's number is displayed in small text at the bottom of each mile marker. State routes that are overlaid on U.S. Routes are not signed; the route numbers are only displayed on the mile markers.

TDOT maintains these routes under the "State Highways" title of state law, but designates them as "state routes". The inverted triangle marker design was the only design until November 1983, when Tennessee divided its routes into primary routes and secondary or "arterial" routes with the adoption of a functional classification system, creating a primary marker and making the triangle marker the secondary marker; primary marker signs were posted in 1984.

See also

Notes

References

State highways in Tennessee